Eastern equine encephalitis (EEE), commonly called  Triple E or sleeping sickness (not to be confused with African trypanosomiasis), is a disease caused by a zoonotic mosquito vectored Togavirus that is present in North, Central, and South America, and the Caribbean. EEE was first recognized in Massachusetts, United States, in 1831, when 75 horses died mysteriously of viral encephalitis.
Epizootics in horses have continued to occur regularly in the United States. It can also be identified in donkeys and zebras. Due to the rarity of the disease, its occurrence can cause economic impact beyond the cost of horses and poultry. EEE is found today in the eastern part of the United States and is often associated with coastal plains. It can most commonly be found in East Coast and Gulf Coast states. In Florida, about one to two human cases are reported a year, although over 60 cases of equine encephalitis are reported. In years in which conditions  are favorable for the disease, the number of equine cases is over 200. Diagnosing equine encephalitis is challenging because many of the symptoms are shared with other illnesses and patients can be asymptomatic. Confirmations may require a sample of cerebral spinal fluid or brain tissue, although CT scans and MRI scans are used to detect encephalitis. This could be an indication that the need to test for EEE is necessary. If a biopsy of the cerebral spinal fluid is taken, it is sent to a specialized laboratory for testing.

Eastern equine encephalitis virus (EEEV) is closely related to Venezuelan equine encephalitis virus and western equine encephalitis virus.

Signs and symptoms
The incubation period for Eastern equine encephalitis virus (EEEV) disease ranges from 4 to 10 days. The illness can progress either systematically or encephalitically, depending on the person's age. Encephalitic disease involves swelling of the brain and can be asymptomatic, while the systemic illness occurs very abruptly. Those with the systemic illness usually recover within 1–2 weeks. While the encephalitis is more common among infants, in adults and children, it usually manifests after experiencing the systemic illness. Symptoms include high fever, muscle pain, altered mental status, headache, meningeal irritation, photophobia, and seizures, which occur 3–10 days after the bite of an infected mosquito. Due to the virus's effect on the brain, patients who survive can be left with mental and physical impairments, such as personality disorders, paralysis, seizures, and intellectual impairment.

Cause

Virus

The causative agent, later identified as a togavirus, was first isolated from infected horse brains in 1933. In 1938, the first confirmed human cases were identified when 30 children died of encephalitis in the Northeastern United States. These cases coincided with outbreaks in horses in the same regions. The fatality rate in humans is 33%, and currently no cure is known for human infections. This virus has four variations in the types in lineage. The most common to the human disease is group 1, which is considered to be endemic in North America and the Caribbean, while the other three lineages, groups IIA, IIB, and III, are typically found in Central and South America, causing equine illness.

These two clades may actually be distinct viruses. The North American strains appear to be monotypic with a mutation rate of 2.7 × 10−4 substitutions/site/year (s/s/y). It appears to have diverged from the other strains 922 to 4,856 years ago. The other strains are divided into two main clades and a third smaller one. The two main clades diverged between 577 and 2,927 years ago. The mutation rate in the genome has been estimated to be 1.2 × 10−4 s/s/y.

Lifecycle
EEEV is capable of infecting a wide range of animals, including mammals, birds, reptiles, and amphibians. The virus is maintained in nature through a bird—mosquito cycle. These mosquitoes feed on the blood of birds. The frequency of the virus found in nature increases throughout the summer as more birds and more mosquitoes become infected.

Transmission of EEEV to mammals (including humans) occurs via other mosquito species, which feed on the blood of both birds and mammals. These other mosquitoes are referred to as "bridge vectors" because they carry the virus from the avian hosts to other types of hosts, particularly mammals. The bridge vectors include Aedes taeniorhynchus, Aedes vexans, Coquillettidia perturbans, Ochlerotatus canadensis, and Ochlerotatus sollicitans. Ochlerotatus canadensis also frequently bites turtles.

Humans, horses, and most other infected mammals do not circulate enough viruses in their blood to infect additional mosquitoes. Some cases of EEE have been contracted through laboratory exposures or from exposure of the eyes, lungs, or skin wounds to brain or spinal cord matter from infected animals.

Prevention
The disease can be prevented in horses with the use of vaccinations, which are usually given with vaccinations for other diseases, most commonly western equine encephalitis virus, Venezuelan equine encephalitis virus, and tetanus.  Most vaccinations for EEE consist of the killed virus. For humans, no vaccine for EEE is available; prevention involves reducing the risk of exposure. Using insect repellent, wearing protective clothing, and reducing the amount of standing water is the best means for prevention.

Treatment

No cure for EEE has been found. Treatment consists of corticosteroids, anticonvulsants, and supportive measures (treating symptoms) such as intravenous fluids, tracheal intubation, and antipyretics. About 4% of humans known to be infected develop symptoms, with a total of about six cases per year in the US. A third of these cases die, and many survivors suffer permanent brain damage.

Epidemiology

United States

Several states in the Northeast U.S. have had increased virus activity since 2004. Between 2004 and 2006, at least ten human cases of EEE were reported in Massachusetts. Several human cases were reported in New Hampshire, as well.

On 19 July 2012, the virus was identified in a mosquito of the species Coquillettidia perturbans in Nickerson State Park on Cape Cod, Massachusetts. On 28 July 2012, the virus was found in mosquitos in Pittsfield, Massachusetts.

, a notable uptick in cases erupted in New England and Michigan, prompting some health departments to declare an outbreak. , five people died in Michigan, three people died in Connecticut, one person died in Rhode Island, one person died in Alabama, one person died in Indiana, and three people died in Massachusetts. The virus was also found in goats, in turkeys, in deer, and in horses.

As of September 9, 2020, there were 5 confirmed human cases between Massachusetts and Wisconsin. As of October 9, 2020, one person died in Michigan, and one person died in Wisconsin.

Europe
In October 2007, a citizen of Livingston, West Lothian, Scotland became the first European victim of this disease. The man had visited New Hampshire during the summer of 2007, on a fishing vacation, and was diagnosed as having EEE on 13 September 2007. He fell ill with the disease on 31 August 2007, just one day after flying home, and later fell into a coma. He later awoke from the coma with severe brain injuries.

Biological weapon
EEEV was one of more than a dozen agents that the United States researched as potential biological weapons before the nation suspended its biological-weapons program in 1969, a few years before signing (1972) and then ratifying (1975) the Biological Weapons Convention.

Other animals

From its natural reservoir in birds, EEEV is known to infect reptiles and amphibians as well as both humans and other mammals, including horses.

Horses
After inoculation by the vector, the virus travels via lymphatics to lymph nodes, and replicates in macrophages and neutrophils, resulting in lymphopenia, leukopenia, and fever. Subsequent replication occurs in other organs, leading to viremia. Symptoms in horses occur 1–3 weeks after infection, and begin with a fever that may reach as high as 106 °F (41 °C). The fever usually lasts for 24–48 hours.

Nervous signs appear during the fever that include sensitivity to sound, periods of excitement, and restlessness.  Brain lesions appear, causing drowsiness, drooping ears, circling, aimless wandering, head pressing, inability to swallow, and abnormal gait.  Paralysis follows, causing the horse to have difficulty raising its head. The horse usually suffers complete paralysis and death 2–4 days after symptoms appear.  Mortality rates among horses with the eastern strain range from 70 to 90%.

References

Further reading
 
 Source for a portion of this information:

External links

 

Alphaviruses
Animal vaccines
Animal viral diseases
Biological weapons
Bird diseases
Horse diseases
Parasites of birds
Viral encephalitis
Viral infections of the central nervous system